Drumbeg Provincial Park is a provincial park on Gabriola Island in British Columbia, Canada.

References

Regional District of Nanaimo
Provincial parks of British Columbia
Year of establishment missing